This is a list of members of the Victorian Legislative Council from the elections of 11 September 1890 to the elections of 8 September 1892.

From 1889 there were fourteen Provinces and a total of 48 members.
 

Note the "Term in Office" refers to that members term(s) in the Council, not necessarily for that Province.

James MacBain was President of the Council, Frank Dobson was Chairman of Committees.

 Beaney died 30 June 1891; replaced by William Pitt, sworn-in August 1891.
 Butters resigned around April 1892, replaced by Arthur Sachse, sworn-in May 1892.
 Illingworth resigned around April 1891; replaced by Joseph Sternberg, sworn-in June 1891.
 Le fevre died 17 October 1891; replaced by Frederick Grimwade, sworn-in November 1891.
 Macpherson died 23 August 1891; replaced by Samuel Williamson, sworn-in October 1891.
 Young died 20 November 1891; replaced by Duncan McBryde, sworn-in December 1891.

References

 Re-member (a database of all Victorian MPs since 1851). Parliament of Victoria.

Members of the Parliament of Victoria by term
19th-century Australian politicians